John Tennent (31 July 1846 – 31 October 1893) was an Australian cricketer. He played two first-class cricket matches for Victoria between 1877 and 1880.

See also
 List of Victoria first-class cricketers

References

External links
 

1846 births
1893 deaths
Australian cricketers
Victoria cricketers
Cricketers from Hobart
Melbourne Cricket Club cricketers